The LK-4 (Leningradskii Kombinat), (a.k.a. NIAI-4) was a tandem two-seat trainer aircraft designed and built in the USSR from 1933.

Development 
In 1930 the LIIPS ( - Leningrad institute for sail and communications engineers) formed a UK GVF ( - training centre for civil air fleet), in turn the UK GVF formed the NIAI (Naoochno-Issledovatel'skiy Aero-Institoot - scientific test aero-institute) which became the focus of several good design engineers who were given command of individual OKB (Osboye Konstrooktorskoye Byuro – personal design/construction bureau).

Designed by  Anatolii Georgievich Bedunkovich, an Engineer Colonel, the LK-4 was really five aircraft in one, for use in research projects and for training in aircraft of different configurations. The wooden airframe was covered in plywood on the forward fuselage and leading edges of the wings, the rest being covered in fabric. The LK-4 was simple to make and used the standard propeller and instruments from the U-2 (oochebnyy – trainer). Testing began early in 1934, with a recommendation being given for production of the aircraft, which never materialised, despite the aircraft's success in several light aircraft competitions from 1934 to 1936.

Variants 
 LK-4-I – The first variation with slats on the upper wing, twin parallel bracing struts and a cantilever lower wing.
 LK-4-II – The second variation had a plain un-slatted upper wing which was moved aft, and the lower wing was moved forward.
 LK-4-III - The third variation was a parasol monoplane, with the lower wing removed.
 LK-4-IV – The final variation was a low-wing monoplane with the lower wing replaced by the upper wing and twin bracing struts to the top of the fuselage.

Specifications (LK-4-1)

See also

References

 Gunston, Bill. “The Osprey Encyclopaedia of Russian Aircraft 1875 – 1995”. London, Osprey. 1995. 

1930s Soviet civil trainer aircraft
NIAI aircraft
Aircraft first flown in 1934
Sesquiplanes